Following are the results of the 2008–09 Eskişehirspor season.  Eskişehirspor is a football club in Eskişehir, Turkey. Also known as Kırmızı Şimşekler (Red Lightnings) or The Star of Anatolia. The club was founded in 1965 and started a football revolution in Anatolia. Eskişehirspor started a long term stay in the first league in Turkey when they were founded.

First-team squad

Süper Lig Matches

Standings

References

Eskişehirspor seasons
Eskisehirspor